Rogalice  is a village in the administrative district of Gmina Lubsza, within Brzeg County, Opole Voivodeship, in south-western Poland.

The village has a population of 350.

References

Rogalice